The following are the national records in track cycling in Spain maintained by the Spanish Cycling Federation (Real Federacion Espanola de Ciclismo).

Men

Women

References
General
Spanish Track Cycling Records 11 October 2021 updated
Specific

External links
RFEC web site

Spain
Records
Track cycling
track cycling